Abdul Halim bin Saari (born 14 November 1994) is a Malaysian professional footballer who plays as central midfielder. Abdul Halim had to be captained and played for Kedah U21 team before been promoted to the senior team in 2016.

Career statistics

Club

International

References

External links
 

1994 births
Living people
Malaysian footballers
Kedah Darul Aman F.C. players
Malaysia Super League players
Association football midfielders
People from Kedah
Malaysian people of Malay descent